KSDJ (90.7 FM, "New Rock 90.7") is a radio station licensed to serve Brookings, South Dakota.  The station is owned by South Dakota State University. It airs an Alternative rock music format.

The station was assigned the KSDJ call letters by the Federal Communications Commission on May 14, 1993.

History of call letters
The call letters KSDJ were previously assigned to an AM station in San Diego, California. It began broadcasting in 1946 and was owned by the San Diego Journal newspaper.

References

External links
KSDJ official website

SDJ
SDJ
Modern rock radio stations in the United States
Brookings County, South Dakota
Radio stations established in 1993
1993 establishments in South Dakota